Flavius Anicius Auchenius Bassus (fl. 425–435) was a high official of the Western Roman Empire. He was appointed as consul by the Western court with Antiochus Chuzon as a colleague. In 435 he held for the second time the office of praetorian prefect of Italy.

Biography 
Bassus belonged to the noble gens Anicia; his father was the Anicius Auchenius Bassus who was consul in 408.

In 425 he held the rank of comes rerum privatarum at the Western court; the following year was praetorian prefect, perhaps of Italy.

He made accusations against Pope Sixtus III; when Emperor Valentinian III learned of these accusations, he ordered a synod to be convoked, at which the accusations were investigated and the Pope cleared by 56 bishops.

Notes

Bibliography 
 John Robert Martindale, Arnold Hugh Martin Jones, John Morris, "Fl. Anicius Auchenius Bassus 8", The Prosopography of the Later Roman Empire, Volume 2, Cambridge University Press, 1992, pp. 220–221.

5th-century Romans
5th-century Roman consuls
Auchenius Bassus (431)
Imperial Roman consuls
Praetorian prefects of Italy